Ghent Historic District is a national historic district located at New Bern, Craven County, North Carolina. It encompasses 191 contributing buildings developed as a suburban residential neighborhood in New Bern between 1912 and 1941.  The district is characterized by dwellings in the Colonial Revival and Bungalow / American Craftsman styles.

It was listed on the National Register of Historic Places in 1988.

References

Historic districts on the National Register of Historic Places in North Carolina
Colonial Revival architecture in North Carolina
Geography of Craven County, North Carolina
Buildings and structures in New Bern, North Carolina
National Register of Historic Places in Craven County, North Carolina